Pelionella, is a genus of mealybugs belonging to the family Pseudococcidae. The genus contains 12 species.

Species
 Pelionella balteata (Green, 1928)
 Pelionella cycliger (Leonardi, 1908)
 Pelionella glandulifer (Borchsenius, 1949)
 Pelionella grassiana (Goux, 1989)
 Pelionella kansui Kaydan, 2015
 Pelionella manifecta (Borchsenius, 1949)
 Pelionella multipora Kaydan, 2015
 Pelionella osakaensis Tanaka, 2018
 Pelionella proeminens (Goux, 1989)
 Pelionella sablia (Goux, 1989)
 Pelionella stellarocheae (Goux, 1990)
 Pelionella tritubulata (Kiritchenko, 1940)

References

Sternorrhyncha genera
Pseudococcidae